Tom Coleman, also credited as Thomas J. Coleman and T. Joseph Coleman, founded the Atlantic Entertainment Group, private independent film and television company, in 1975 and served as its president. He became chairman and CEO of Prism Entertainment when the company merged with Atlantic in 1988. Coleman was chairman of Independent Entertainment Group. Rocket Pictures, an indie production company, was founded by Coleman in 1992. He is an Executive member of the Academy of Motion Picture Arts and Sciences, and an industry consultant for the Zurich Consulting Group based in Switzerland. 
In July 2001, he became CEO, President and director of Sun Network Group. Coleman is the Lead Producer of the musical ModRock.

Under his nom de plume, Hagan Thomas-Jones, Coleman is a member of the Dramatists Guild. He is currently CEO of Innovativ Media Group, a developer, producer and distributor of multi-media content. It has acquired many of the assets of Lux Digital Pictures including a library of feature motion pictures and, via New Broadway Cinema, produces adaptations of stage shows utilizing its trademarked DigiTheater™ virtual reality process. Innovativ also operates The Alien Channel on YouTube, in partnership with FullScreen, Inc., is developing the new web series Just Smart People, the customized movie title search destination VOD Movie Guide, and is a principal in the Film Finance Exchange.

Partial filmography
Source

References

American film producers